Derek Talbot  (born 23 March 1947) is a former English badminton player. One of Britain's most successful "all-rounders," he won eleven English National Championships four singles, three doubles, and four mixed doubles. He also won four Commonwealth Games gold medals and in partnership with the formidable Gillian Gilks he won three mixed doubles crowns at the prestigious All-England Open (1973, 1976, and 1977).

Career

World Championships
He won a silver medal in the 1977 IBF World Championships in mixed doubles with Gillian Gilks, losing against Steen Skovgaard and Lene Køppen in the final.

1972 Summer Olympics
Talbot competed in badminton at the 1972 Summer Olympics, where badminton was played as a demonstration sport. In men's doubles he and Elliot Stuart, his former schoolfellow in Newcastle upon Tyne, were defeated in the semifinals by Ade Chandra and Christian Hadinata 15–8, 15–12. In mixed doubles he paired with Gillian Gilks and they won the gold medal, beating Svend Pri and Ulla Strand of Denmark in the final 15–6, 18–16.

Commonwealth Games
Derek Talbot was also successful at the Commonwealth Games, he won 4 gold medals, a silver medal and two bronze medals between 1970 and 1978.

Major achievements

International tournaments 
Men's doubles

Post-Badminton
Towards the latter stages of his badminton career Derek ran a sports shop, which specialised in racket sports, with ex-South African badminton internationalist Eddie Allen, and local man Neil Woodward, in Newcastle. They sold their own Vicourt badminton rackets. When he retired from serious competition, he set up his own badminton company called Talbot Torro Badminton. In recent years Derek left his more traditional career behind and ultimately set up the Natural Patient homeopathic centre in Ibiza.

He was appointed Member of the Order of the British Empire (MBE) in the 2013 Birthday Honours for services to badminton.

References

English male badminton players
Commonwealth Games gold medallists for England
Commonwealth Games silver medallists for England
Commonwealth Games bronze medallists for England
Badminton players at the 1970 British Commonwealth Games
Badminton players at the 1974 British Commonwealth Games
Badminton players at the 1978 Commonwealth Games
Living people
Badminton players at the 1972 Summer Olympics
Members of the Order of the British Empire
Commonwealth Games medallists in badminton
1947 births
Medallists at the 1970 British Commonwealth Games
Medallists at the 1974 British Commonwealth Games
Medallists at the 1978 Commonwealth Games